Colin Alexander Ingram (born 3 July 1985) is a South African cricketer who currently plays for Glamorgan. He represented South Africa in One Day (ODI) and Twenty20 Internationals (T20I) between 2010 and 2013, scoring a century on his ODI debut against Zimbabwe.

Early life

Ingram was born in Port Elizabeth. He attended Woodridge College in the Eastern Cape where he was their star cricketer in his years there. He played for the college for five years, captaining the side for three of them. He made his school First XI debut at the age of 14 and continued to play at this level throughout the rest of his high school career. He played provincial cricket for the Eastern Province team and was also selected for the South African schools team.

Ingram accepted a scholarship to study at the University of the Free State in 2004. He enjoyed a successful stint in the university team before leaving to return to the Eastern Cape.

First class, domestic & club cricket
Ingram struggled for a batting spot in the Eastern Province originally, but soon after he gained experience from both County Cricket, and some playing time for Eastern Province, his skills increased with each innings played.

Ingram is among the brightest talent produced by the Eastern Cape in recent years. In a region of South Africa that has often seen its budding stars bloom fully elsewhere, Ingram has remained true to his roots and stayed with the Warriors. He brings a bracing brand of aggression to opening the batting, and he took his game to the next level when he scored 85 off 111 balls to guide South Africa A to victory over Pakistan A in Colombo in the first match of a triangular series that also involved Sri Lanka A.

It was announced on 21 November 2014 that Ingram had signed a three-year contract with Glamorgan as a Kolpak player subject to clearance from Cricket South Africa, the ECB and him obtaining a visa. He had a very successful one day season with Glamorgan in 2015 scoring 405 runs in 8 matches at an average of 81 including three centuries and one 50. His Championship season was steady rather than spectacular as he scored 931 runs at 37.24 with two centuries and four 50s.

Warriors

Ingram played for the Chevrolet Warriors in South African domestic cricket and he was previously captain of this team. He participated in the 2010 Champions League Twenty20, scoring well and assisting his team to reach the final. During the 2015 One Day Cup he almost took Warriors to the final in Cape Town against Cape Cobras, but they were beaten on the net run-rate by the Titans. He scored 93, 106 not out and 90 not out consecutively. The 90 was made in a thrilling South African domestic one day record-breaking run chase against Lions in a match that was played in Buffalo Park, East London.

Twenty20 Leagues
As well as playing for Warriors and Glamorgan, Ingram has had some success in Twenty20 leagues, having appeared in the IPL, Big Bash League, Pakistan Super League, Caribbean Premier League and Afghanistan Premier League. He is the first captain to win the Bat Toss conducted by Mathew Hayden for Adelaide Strikers against Brisbane Heat in the Big Bash League.

In September 2018, he was named in Kabul's squad in the first edition of the Afghanistan Premier League tournament. In December 2018, he was bought by the Delhi Capitals in the player auction for the 2019 Indian Premier League. On 24 February 2019, he became the first player of the team Karachi Kings to score a century, as well as the highest individual scorer in Pakistan Super League at that time.

In July 2019, he was selected to play for the Belfast Titans in the inaugural edition of the Euro T20 Slam cricket tournament. However, the following month the tournament was cancelled. He was released by the Delhi Capitals ahead of the 2020 IPL auction. Ahead of the 2020 PSL Draft, he was released by Karachi Kings, he played for two years with the franchise. In December 2019, he was drafted by Islamabad United as second pick of the Platinum Category round at the 2020   PSL draft. In July 2020, he was named in the St Lucia Zouks squad for the 2020 Caribbean Premier League. However, Ingram was one of five South African cricketers to miss the tournament, after failing to confirm travel arrangements in due time.

In October 2020, he was drafted by the Galle Gladiators for the inaugural edition of the Lanka Premier League.

International career 
Ingram made his Twenty20 International debut against Zimbabwe during Zimbabwe's tour of South Africa in 2010, playing in both matches. He didn't  bat for long, scoring a total of 15 runs in the two-match series (3 & 12) as South Africa registered victories in both matches. He made his mark on his ODI debut in the ODI series against Zimbabwe  that followed by scoring a century (124), only the sixth person to score a century on debut and the first South African ever to achieve this honour.

References

External links

Living people
1985 births
South African cricketers
South Africa One Day International cricketers
South Africa Twenty20 International cricketers
Adelaide Strikers cricketers
Delhi Capitals cricketers
Eastern Province cricketers
Free State cricketers
Glamorgan cricketers
Hobart Hurricanes cricketers
Islamabad United cricketers
Kabul Zwanan cricketers
Karachi Kings cricketers
Somerset cricketers
Warriors cricketers
Cricketers at the 2011 Cricket World Cup
Cricketers who made a century on One Day International debut
Cricketers from Port Elizabeth
South African people of British descent
Oval Invincibles cricketers
University of the Free State alumni